SM UB-37 was a German Type UB II submarine or U-boat in the German Imperial Navy during World War I. The U-boat was ordered on 22 July 1915 and launched on 28 December 1915. She was commissioned into the German Imperial Navy on 17 June 1916 as SM UB-37.

The submarine sank 31 ships in ten patrols, and was itself sunk by British Q ship  in the English Channel on 14 January 1917.
 
The wreck of UB-37 was identified by marine archaeologist Innes McCartney in 1999.

Design
A German Type UB II submarine, UB-37 had a displacement of  when at the surface and  while submerged. The submarine was powered by two Benz six-cylinder diesel engines producing a total , two Siemens-Schuckert electric motors producing , and one propeller shaft.

UB-37 was fitted with two  torpedo tubes, four torpedoes, and one  Uk L/30 deck gun. She had a complement of twenty-one crew members and two officers and a 42-second dive time.

Summary of raiding history

Notes

References

Bibliography 

 

1915 ships
Ships built in Hamburg
World War I submarines of Germany
German Type UB II submarines
U-boats commissioned in 1916
Maritime incidents in 1917
U-boats sunk in 1917
U-boats sunk by depth charges
U-boats sunk by British warships
World War I shipwrecks in the English Channel
Ships lost with all hands